The relief organisation "Medico International", which is one of participant to the International Campaign to Ban Landmines together with concept artist Peter Zizka collaborated under the motto of The Virtual Minefield in order to draw attention to the threat of land mines and unexploded ordnance in many of the world's countries.

For this purpose, Peter Zizka created a floor-based art installation called “The Virtual Minefield” which photographically shows precise images of land mines. Those walking over it experience the bizarre beauty inherent in the pattern of varied shapes and materials. The terrible item is not immediately apparent. Within the scope of the art and charity event “600 x Bewegung schaffen – Räumt die Mine” (“600 x creating movement – clear the mines”) to raise money for the land mine victim fund of Medico International, it was possible to acquire 80 × 80 cm segments of the installation. Receipts were issued for the donations and at the end of the event the 600 limited art segments were distributed. Proceeds went and still go towards financing the extensive work of clearing minefields, psychological and physical rehabilitation measures for land mine victims and education programmes for the public with regard to the risks of land mines in Medico's project regions in Angola, Afghanistan, Cambodia and El Salvador.

It was possible to acquire segments via a campaign page. The Virtual Minefield is displayed as a pattern of many small squares. Similar to a game of Memory, the cleared fields are turned over and the donor is able to check which land mine-victim-program will receive the donation. After the cross-Europe exhibition tour he will receive the segment he chose on the website.

The Virtual Minefield received the Gold Award from the jury of ADC Deutschland and ADC Europe.

Notable exhibitions 

 Kunsthal Rotterdam
 Schauspiel Frankfurt
 Kulturgeschichtliches Museum Osnabrück
 Deutsches Hygiene-Museum Dresden/Welcome Collection

External links  
 Website of the exhibition
 medico Spendenaktion

Installation art